James Francis Lanagan (November 16, 1878 – August 7, 1937) was an American football, rugby, and baseball coach at Stanford University.

Lanagan played college baseball at Stanford from 1897 to 1900.  In 1902, he married Clara Earl, a fellow member of the Stanford Class of 1900.

In 1903, despite never having played football, Lanagan was selected as Stanford's head football coach, and coached the team for three years, compiling an overall record of 23–2–4.

Following the 1905 season, Stanford, responding like other American universities to concerns about the violence in football, dropped football in favor of rugby from 1906 to 1917. Despite having no knowledge of the sport, Lanagan was retained as the rugby coach, spending time in Vancouver, British Columbia and Australia to study the sport. In his first season, the team ended with a 6–2–1 season. Lanagan remained as rugby coach for two more seasons. He also served as Stanford's baseball coach from 1906 to 1907.

Lanagan attended Stanford Law School from 1905 to 1907.  He resigned from coaching in 1908 to focus on his law practice.

During World War I, Lanagan was a major in the United States Army, fighting in France, where he contracted a lung disease that would eventually result in his death two decades later.

Head coaching record

Football

References

External links
 

1878 births
1937 deaths
19th-century baseball players
United States Army personnel of World War I
California lawyers
Stanford Cardinal football coaches
Stanford Cardinal baseball players
Stanford Cardinal baseball coaches
Stanford Law School alumni
United States Army officers
People from Paris, Kentucky